ARA Puerto Deseado (Q-20) is an oceanographic survey ship in service in the Argentine Navy. She has a reinforced hull in order to operate in waters around Antarctica.

History
Puerto Deseado was built by Astilleros Argentinos Río de la Plata (Astarsa) shipyard in Tigre, Buenos Aires and commissioned into the Argentine Navy in 1978. She was the first navy ship to be named upon the city of Puerto Deseado in the patagonian Santa Cruz province.

During the 1982 Falklands War she served as hospital ship.

On 2003 she participated on the unsuccessful attempt to find the sunken cruiser  along with a National Geographic team on the vessel Seacor Lenga.

Puerto Deseado serves the CONICET, the Argentine government agency that directs and co-ordinates scientific and technical research. The ship actively participated on the summer Antarctic campaigns. Her scientific equipment includes a gravimetric sensor, magnetometers, seismic systems, high frequency sound sonar and a geological laboratory.

In March 2010 she began studies on behalf of Repsol YPF.

She is homeported at Mar del Plata.

References
 Official site 
 ARA Puerto Deseado at Irizar.org

External links

 Puerto Deseado pictorial at Histarmar
 HMS Clyde Encountering ARA Puerto Deseado
 Video

Auxiliary ships of the Argentine Navy
Research vessels of Argentina
Ships built in Argentina
1976 ships
Hospital ships during the Falklands War